Oleh Kovalenko (born 11 April 1988) is a Ukrainian professional footballer, who plays for Real Pharma Odesa in the Ukrainian Second League. He plays the position of midfielder or striker. His former clubs include FC Helios Kharkiv, FC Dnister Ovidiopol and FC Pärnu Vaprus in Estonian Meistriliiga.

He scored his first Meistriliiga goal on 30 August 2008, in the 22nd minute of a 1–2 loss against JK Maag Tammeka Tartu.

References

External links
 

1988 births
Living people
Pärnu JK Vaprus players
FC Dnister Ovidiopol players
Expatriate footballers in Estonia
Ukrainian footballers
Association football midfielders
Ukrainian expatriate footballers
Ukrainian expatriate sportspeople in Estonia